Boris Smirnov may refer to:
Boris Alexandrovich Smirnov (actor) (1908–1982), Soviet actor in the film Zhukovsky
Boris Smirnov-Rusetsky (1905–1993), Russian painter
Boris Smirnov (ethnologist) (1924–1979), Russian ethnologist

See also
 Smirnov (surname)
 Smirnoff (surname)